Tubna (also spelled Tibna or Tebnah) is a village in southern Syria, administratively part of the Daraa Governorate in the Hauran region. It is located 58 km south of Damascus and 42 km from Daraa.

History
Tubna was the seat of a Monophysite monastery by the second half of the 6th century. The Byzantine Empire’s Ghassanid Arab vassals apparently maintained a presence in Tubna as evidenced by a verse by the contemporary poet al-Nabigha that placed the tomb of the Ghassanid emir between “Tubna and Jasim”. Moreover, the Ghassanids were adamant supporters of the Monophysite church and their relationship with Tubna may have been based on their support for its monastery.

The Syrian geographer Yaqut al-Hamawi noted  in the 1220s that Tubna was "a town of the Hauran, belonging to the Damascus Province".

Ottoman era
In 1596 Tubna appeared in the Ottoman tax registers as Tibna and was part of the nahiya (subdistrict) of Bani Kilab in the Hauran Sanjak. It had an entirely Muslim population consisting of 30 households and 25 bachelors. The villagers paid a fixed tax rate of 40%  on wheat, barley, summer crops, goats and beehives; a total of 16,460  akçe. 2,5/24 of the revenue went to a waqf.

In 1838, Tibny was noted as a Muslim village, situated "the Nukra, north of Al-Shaykh Maskin".

Demographics
According to the Syria Central Bureau of Statistics (CBS), Tubna had a population of 1,272 in 2004. 
The inhabitants are predominantly Melkite Greek Catholics. The village is among the handful of Melkite villages that straddle the hills separating the Hauran plain and Jabal al-Druze massif.

References

Bibliography

External links
Map of town, Google Maps
Naoua-map; 20L
 www.khabab.net
http://www.esyria.sy/edaraa/index.php?p=stories&category=places&filename=200802241815014

Populated places in Al-Sanamayn District
Melkite Christian communities in Syria